The 1994 Wisconsin Badgers football team represented the University of Wisconsin during the 1994 NCAA Division I-A football season. They were led by fifth year head coach Barry Alvarez and participated as members of the Big Ten Conference. The Badgers played their home games at Camp Randall Stadium in Madison, Wisconsin.

Schedule

Wisconsin won consecutive postseason bowl games for the first time ever with a 34–20 win over Duke in the Hall of Fame Bowl.

Michigan State later forfeited victory after University President Peter M. McPherson had their 5 season wins self forfeited due to his claim of a 'lack of institutional control'.

Wisconsin's 31–19 win over Michigan in 1994 was the last time Wisconsin won in the confines of Michigan Stadium, until the 2010 Badgers defeated Michigan 48–28 in Ann Arbor.

Roster

Regular starters

1995 NFL Draft

References

Wisconsin
Wisconsin Badgers football seasons
ReliaQuest Bowl champion seasons
Wisconsin Badgers football